Artocarpus lanceifolius, also known as keledang in Malay and more locally as timakon or kaliput, is a species of flowering plant, a fruit tree in the fig family, that is native to Southeast Asia.

Description
The species grows as a monoecious tree to 35 m in height, with a bole of up to 5 m. The smooth oval to lance-shaped leaves are 12–30 cm long by 6–17 cm wide. The inflorescences occur in the leaf axils. The fruits are infructescent, olive to brown in colour, 8–12 cm by 7–8 cm in diameter, containing seeds covered by an edible, sweet and juicy aril.

Variety
The variety endemic to north-eastern Borneo, sometimes considered a subspecies A. l. clementis, differs in having somewhat more lanceolate leaves, and the fruits having an orange (rather than white) aril.

Distribution and habitat
The species is found in the Malay Peninsula, Sumatra and Borneo, where it occurs as an understorey tree of lowland and hill mixed dipterocarp forest and secondary forest up to an elevation of 1,000 m.

References

lanceifolius
Flora of Borneo
Flora of Malaya
Flora of Sumatra
Fruits originating in Asia
Plants described in 1832
Taxa named by William Roxburgh